Metzgar is a surname. Notable people with the surname include:

Carl Walker Metzgar (born 1981), American politician
Eric Daniel Metzgar, American filmmaker 
Richard W. Metzgar (born 1953), American politician

See also
Metzger